Lillian Boraks-Nemetz was born in Warsaw, Poland, where she survived the Holocaust as a child, escaped the Warsaw Ghetto and lived in Polish villages under a false identity. She has a master's degree in Comparative Literature and teaches Creative Writing at the University of British Columbia's Writing Centre. She is the author of numerous books, including Ghost Children, a collection of poetry, and 
The Old Brown Suitcase, a young adult novel.

References

External links
Official website
Holocaust survivor tackles trauma and family's past in new novel
Holocaust Survivors Share Their Memories of Destroyed Childhoods

Living people
1933 births
Canadian women novelists
Jewish Canadian writers